Diane Meier is an author of The New American Wedding and The Season of Second Chances, and the founder of Meier, LLC, a luxury marketing firm founded in New York City. She has been a keen advocate of working women’s rights.
She lived in New York City and Litchfield, Connecticut.

Works

References

External links
 http://meierbrand.com/

Living people
1943 births